In Greek mythology, Amphimarus (Ancient Greek: Ἀμφίμαρος) was the son of Poseidon and father of the musician Linus by the Muse Urania. Linus was killed by Apollo (in this account he was not identified as the son of the god) for being his rival in singing.

Note

References 

 Parada, Carlos, Genealogical Guide to Greek Mythology, Jonsered, Paul Åströms Förlag, 1993. .
 Pausanias, Description of Greece with an English Translation by W.H.S. Jones, Litt.D., and H.A. Ormerod, M.A., in 4 Volumes. Cambridge, MA, Harvard University Press; London, William Heinemann Ltd. 1918. . Online version at the Perseus Digital Library
 Pausanias, Graeciae Descriptio. 3 vols. Leipzig, Teubner. 1903.  Greek text available at the Perseus Digital Library.

Children of Poseidon
Demigods in classical mythology